Anne Lorne Gillies is a Scottish singer, writer, and activist.

Early life 
Gillies was born in Stirling, Scotland in 1944 and moved to Oban at the age of 5. She attended Rockfield Primary School, Oban and Oban High School. She was Dux of Oban High School 1962. She adopted the middle name Lorne when joining Equity Actors Union to indicate her connections with Oban.  

Gillies' musical upbringing was wide-ranging. Her maternal grandparents were professional classical violinists and Gillies learned to play the piano from an early age.   While a pupil at Oban High School, she was inspired by many of her teachers, especially her English teacher, the poet Iain Crichton Smith, and John Maclean, the Rector (Headmaster) of the school, a native of the Island of Raasay, a classical scholar, and the brother of poet Sorley Maclean, from whom she learned a large number of Gaelic songs and to whom she dedicated her seminal book Songs of Gaelic Scotland (Birlinn, Edinburgh, 2005).

In her teens, Gillies sang, danced, and played at cèilidhs, concerts, and Mòds, and even introduced a touch of Gaelic culture to BBC Radio Scotland's Children's Hour. She also took advantage of the wide variety of amateur musical and theatrical productions that Oban offered, from school-based folk-group, baroque ensemble, debating society, and drama productions, to local bands, Gilbert and Sullivan productions, and public speaking.

In 1962, three months after leaving Oban High School, she won the coveted Women's Gold Medal for singing at the Royal National Mòd—an honour which brought with it a raft of opportunities to perform in concerts, tours, folk-clubs, and festivals on both sides of the Border.

During her early career, Gillies sang at large-scale Gaelic concerts on the official program of the Edinburgh International Festival (Usher Hall, Leith Town Hall) and appeared in the first of many live Hogmanay shows (1964) to an audience of over 20 million people. She took part in a televised folk concert in Glasgow's Kelvin Hall, organized by poet/folklorist Hamish Henderson, where she sang  alongside  Scots and Irish traditional performers such as Jeannie Robertson and The Chieftains. Following this appearance, Gillies struck up a musical partnership with Jimmy MacBeath, an itinerant worker and singer of Bothy Ballads from the north east of Scotland. During these early years, Gillies also gave regular radio recitals of a capella Gaelic song on BBC Scotland, and sang on the early BBC Gaelic black-and-white television series Songs all the Way.

In 1965, Gillies graduated MA (Celtic and English) from the University of Edinburgh, and went on to complete a post-graduate year as research student/transcriber in the School of Scottish Studies, at a time when the collection of Scotland's precious heritage of Gaelic song was at its peak.   Then, in 1966, she left Scotland to pursue classical vocal training in Italy and London. She spent the next five years completing her apprenticeship both as a singer, under the tutelage of German Lieder experts Helene Isepp, Ilse Wolf and Paul Hamburger, and also (to "have something to fall back on")   was a secondary school teacher of English, History and Music. Having acquired a Postgraduate Certificate in Education from the University of London (PGCE), she went on to teach in a huge, progressive, arts-orientated comprehensive school in Bicester, Oxfordshire, famed for the size and quality of its Music Department: its impressive end-of-term productions involved the whole community and included Wagner's Die Meistersinger and Verdi's Nabucco (with Gillies in the rôle of Abigail). 

Her signature self-penned song is Hills of Lorne. Lorne is a district in the Argyll and Bute council area and Oban is its capital.

Television performer
Gillies returned to Scotland in 1971, and has been based there ever since singing in concerts, theater, studio recordings, and radio and television recordings.

Her media “break” came as resident singer on Mainly Magnus (1971–72) – a 26-week live Saturday night TV chat-show (BBC Scotland) hosted by Magnus Magnusson. Other BBC Scotland TV programmes followed, including the much-loved Gaelic musical series 'S e ur beatha BBC Scotland, on which Gillies sang and introduced traditional performers including Aly Bain, Tom Anderson and Na h-Òganaich.

In 1973, shortly after the birth of her first child, she starred in a one-off eponymous 50-minute "special" programme (BBC2 UK network) with guest star Stefan Grapelli. Showcasing Gillies' wide musical repertoire and also featuring her talent as a storyteller and illustrator, this show gained her the rather ironic title of "Best TV Newcomer of the Year", as voted for by readers of the Daily Record for TRICS, the Television and Radio Industries Club of Scotland. (Even more ironically she was invited back the following year to present the same award to Billy Connolly.)

Other highlights during this time include:

• Anne Lorne Gillies: another 50-minute “one-off music special” (network/UK: BBC2, for legendary producer Yvonne Littlewood) was followed by a series of six programmes with the same format in which Gillies presented and sang with a stunning array of international guests including the Swingle Singers, The Kings Singers, the Chieftains, Fairport Convention, Scottish Ballet, Juan Martine, Niels-Henning Ørsted Pedersen.

• There was a Girl: a series created for BBC Scotland by the Laurence Olivier Award-winning English dancer Gillian Lynne (choreographer of Cats, Phantom of the Opera, etc. who was created a Dame in 2014). In each programme Anne told a separate love story through music and dance with the help of a troupe of male Broadway dancers, and each featured a male star of film and stage: George Chakiris (American Academy Award-winning actor/dancer, best known for creating the rôle of Bernardo Nuñez, leader of the Sharks, in the Hollywood smash-hit musical West Side Story), David Hemmings (star of Michaelangelo's Antonioni's enigmatic English film Blow-up), French actor / dancer Jean-Pierre Cassel (Murder on the Orient Express, Oh! What a Lovely War, Prêt-à-Porter) and Barry Ingham, star of the Royal Shakespeare Company and musicals on Broadway and London's West End (Gypsy, Camelot, Aspects of Love)

• Something to Sing About (BBC2 UK/network) six 50-minute Light Entertainment programmes co-starring legendary Scottish comedian Chick Murray, actors Patrick Malahide and Jan Wilson, and Scots baritone Peter Morrison.

• The Castles of Mar (BBC Scotland) location OB series filmed in Royal Deeside from some of the National Trust for Scotland's most iconic castles. Anne sang Scots songs, mainly from the North-East tradition, and introduced some of Scotland's most enduring entertainers, including Andy Stewart, Isla St Clair, Fulton MacKay, Russell Hunter and Iain Cuthbertson

• Many one-off TV shows, including Rhythm on Two (contrasting the styles of Gillies and Barbara Dickson, BBC2 UK); Anna agus Clannad (BBC Scotland) – highlighting stylistic similarities and distinctions between the Scots and Irish Gaelic traditions; The Puffer’s Progress: an hour-long film (BBC1 network/UK) shot on location on board a Clyde ‘puffer’ as she steamed slowly along the Crinan Canal, and showcasing Gillies' own original songs – including her “signature song” “The Hills of Lorne”; My kind of music (BBC1 network/UK) also showcasing Gillies' own songs, including “After the Pantomime”: with special guest star, Alan Price.

• Numerous guest appearances on popular BBC TV series such as Castles in the Air, Songs of Scotland, The Max Boyce Show and Talla a’ Bhaile; on, Independent channels, Thingummyjig, Sir Harry Secombe’s Highway; and of course the live Hogmanay shows (BBC and ITV network/UK) in which Gillies starred regularly, over the years, alongside Scottish stars such as Kenneth MacKellar, Iain Cuthbertson, Alastair MacDonald, Peter Morrison and Annie Ross.

• Children's programmes: Gillies' brief but enjoyable stint as Scottish anchorperson on the Multi-coloured Swap Shop (presented by Noel Edmonds and Keith Chegwyn) was interrupted by the birth of her third child. Thereafter she was involved in several Gaelic children's series, including Bzzz which featured twelve original Gaelic pop-songs co-written by Anne and pianist David Pringle.

From the late 1980s onwards Gillies increasingly worked as presenter / interviewer of adult programmes, especially those in, or relating to, the Gaelic language: she fronted three series of About Gaelic (Scottish Television's popular and informative chat-show – an "introduction to Gaelic culture for non-Gaelic speakers") and Barail nam Boireannach – two challenging hour-long Gaelic language versions of Scottish Television's current affairs series 100 Scottish Women. She was also a guest presenter on BBC's Saturday Night at the Mill (where she interviewed, among others, Tippi Hedren, star of Alfred Hitchcock's film The Birds) and, in the 1990s, completed a terrifying 5-day stint chairing Channel Four's live daytime current affairs programme Powerhouse.

More recently, with the growth of Gaelic-medium television programming, her innumerable appearances have included
 interviewee in chat-shows such as Còmhradh ri Fionnlagh and Domhnall MacLeòid agus Dòmhnall MacLeòid (STV / Grampian);
 Thuige seo and Fonn mo bheatha with Cathy Anne MacPhee (BBC Alba) 
 presenter of religious series: Laoidhean agus Sailm and Spiorad Dhè (STV / Grampian)
 actor in Leabhar an Àigh – dramatised documentary about the man who wrote the definitive Gaelicdictionary, Edward Dwelly (BBC Alba)
 writer / presenter of Dà chànan aon chridhe / Twa heids ane hert 45-minute TV musical documentary about Robert Burns (MNE for BBC2) with guest musicians including Sheena Wellington, Jim Malcolm, Karen Matheson, Donald Shaw, James Graham, Maggie MacInnes
 writer / producer of Para Shandaidh, Sàr Mharaiche (Brìgh for BBC2) a Gaelic drama-documentary which earned Gillies' favourite of all her many reviews over the years: "There is a clear temptation to say that “Para Handy, Master Mariner was ‘chust sublime’, but since it contained only a passing reference to the incident involving a flying tortoise in Glasgow's Carrick Street, the accolade is withheld... An affectionate, thoroughly enjoyable film." (Ian Bell, Scotsman)

Champion of Gaelic 
Throughout her career Gillies has espoused many causes, charitable, cultural and political: she has given her services freely to raise funds and public awareness for many organisations – medical, social, artistic, political – especially those connected to children and Scottish Gaelic culture. In 1983 she was invited to take on the role of Patron of Comhairle nan Sgoiltean Àraich (the Gaelic Voluntary Playgroup Association) and then became a key player in a no-holds barred nationwide campaign to persuade the authorities to recognise the importance of the Gaelic language both within Scotland and at international level: the urgent need to reverse the decline of Gaelic as a spoken language and to protect and develop its rich heritage through its development as a medium of communication on radio and television and, especially, in mainstream education.

In between raising her own three children she worked in support of Gaelic voluntary organisations, raising funds and public awareness, organising events, committees and parental groups, and using her contacts and expertise to persuade all political parties, as well as the educational establishment, to acknowledge the viability and value of Gaelic in the modern world – specifically as a medium of education at every level of education, both formal and in the community. In 1983 she was commissioned by Sabhal Mòr Ostaig (the Gaelic College in Skye) to conduct a large-scale study into “popular attitudes towards Gaelic and its relevance to 20th century Scotland”. Her report led directly to her return to University: first as a full-time post-graduate student in the University of Strathclyde, where she.gained an Additional Qualification as a primary teacher which enabled her fully to support the newly established Gaelic-medium units on both a voluntary and a professional basis. She also attended the University of Glasgow for a part-time Masters’ course in Multicultural Education, which was commuted after one year to a part-time PhD.: Fraser, Anne (1989) “Gaelic in primary education: a study of the development of Gaelic bilingual education in urban contexts”. PhD thesis, University of Glasgow.

She completed this in record time while simultaneously holding down the post of National Education Development Officer with Comann na Gàidhlig (CnaG), the principal Government-funded language development agency at the time. Gillies' remit with CnaG was the promotion of Gaelic as a medium of education at all levels, from preschool to tertiary; to inform parents, educators, the media, government officials and politicians of all parties of the historical importance of Gaelic to Scotland and the world, and to facilitate its usage in the modern context and continuance for future generations. The work of Anne and her colleagues throughout the Gaelic-speaking community led to a sea-change in the fortunes of the language, with unprecedented levels of official support, its burgeoning usage within the Scottish education system and media, and – vitally – its endorsement and encouragement among native Gaelic-speakers and learners at grassroots level. Massively heartening developments which could not have been predicted when Gillies' own children were growing up.

In 1991 Gillies was appointed by Govan Initiative Ltd to develop an arts strategy for the enrichment of a disparate and often dispirited area that had suffered from acute social and economic problems since the decline of the shipbuilding industry. She devised a wide array of arts activities designed to address problems of unemployment, homelessness, addiction, disability, and fear of crime. Among these was the Greater Govan Youth Theatre, a network of groups designed to develop skills and overcome social, sectarian and territorial dichotomies. Conscious of the historical presence of a substantial Gaelic-speaking population in Govan, Gillies devised and produced Tuathcheòl – a televised Gaelic country music series from Glasgow's Grand Ole Opry on Govan Road that became popular with audiences throughout Scotland and Ireland.

In 1996 she was appointed Gaelic Lecturer in the Faculty of Education of the University of Strathclyde.

Gillies has served voluntarily on numerous committees and working-parties, including the Scottish Arts Council Music Committee, The Gaelic Books Council and the Curriculum for Excellence Consultative Group on Gaelic.

Political activism 
In 1990s she became publicly and actively involved in the Scottish National Party (SNP), an organisation with which her family had had ties, both direct and indirect, for many decades (see William Gillies). In 1996 she was elected to the SNP's National Council and National Executive Committee, appointed Cabinet Spokesperson on the Arts, Culture and Gaelic, and then stood as SNP candidate for the Western Isles constituency at the 1997 general election and put her public profile to use throughout Scotland in promoting Devolution.

In September 1998 she was selected as a candidate for the 1999 European Parliament elections following year by delegates at the SNP's conference.

Writer 
Her extensive published works include autobiography Song of Myself (Mainstream, 1992), short stories written under her married name Anne Bree (Polygon, 2000, 2001); Gaelic children's fiction and poetry under her Gaelic name Anna Latharna NicGillìosa (Acair, Brìgh, Stòrlann) and her seminal collection Songs of Gaelic Scotland (Birlinn) now in its 3rd edition. Published in 2005, Songs of Gaelic Scotland won the prestigious academic Ratcliff Prize for "an important contribution by an individual to the study of Folk and Folklore in Great Britain and Ireland".

She has also worked as writer / producer of Gaelic programmes at Scottish television, notably on Speaking our Language – Scottish Television's flagship multimedia adult learning series – and Caraidean, Channel Four's preschool Gaelic learning Series. She also co-wrote Reoiteag air Rothan / The Ice-cream Factory for Channel 5.

Honours and awards
Gillies was elected by the membership of the Association of Speakers’ Clubs of Great Britain as their Speaker of the Year, 2005.

Other awards and honours have included an Honorary Doctorate from the University of Edinburgh; Fellowships from the University of the Highlands and Islands, the Royal Incorporation of Architects in Scotland, and the Association for Scottish Literary Studies; and her appointment in 2009 as Tosgair na Gàidhlig (Gaelic Ambassador) by the Scottish Government.

Her voluntary and charitable work has been recognised by the award of Rotary International's Paul Harris Fellowship.

Anne was inducted into the Scottish Traditional Music Hall of Fame in 2012.

2000 onwards 
She left Strathclyde University in 2000, to work freelance again, specifically to address the urgent need for resources (print, electronic etc.) in Gaelic-medium classrooms. She moved to Ayrshire and, along with her husband, Kevin Bree, set up an independent Gaelic multimedia partnership (Brìgh) producing Gaelic books and talking books, television and radio programmes, music CDs, CD-ROMs (educational games and teachers’ packs etc.) She continues to sing, teach and lead master-classes and workshops on Gaelic music on both sides of the Atlantic and appears fairly frequently as a singer / interviewee on BBC Alba and BBC Radio nan Gàidheal.

She is currently writing a historical novel set in 17th century Scotland, Ireland and France.

Family
Anne Lorne Gillies is married to Kevin Bree. She has three children by her previous marriage to Neil Fraser. Anne's brother is Prof. William Gillies.

References

External links
 Website

Living people
1944 births
Scottish journalists
Scottish women journalists
20th-century Scottish women singers
Scottish women writers
Scottish National Party parliamentary candidates
People from Lorne, Scotland
Scottish scholars and academics
Alumni of the University of Edinburgh
Scottish folk singers
Scottish entertainers
Scottish Gaelic language activists